Rasheed Broadbell (born 13 August 2000) is a Jamaican hurdler who specializes in the 110 metres hurdles, which he won at the 2022 Commonwealth Games.

References

External links 
 

2000 births
Living people
Jamaican male hurdlers
Commonwealth Games gold medallists for Jamaica
Athletes (track and field) at the 2022 Commonwealth Games
World Athletics Championships athletes for Jamaica
Commonwealth Games gold medallists in athletics
21st-century Jamaican people
Medallists at the 2022 Commonwealth Games